The Sanamahi creation myth is the traditional creation myth of Sanamahism, a religion of the Meitei, Chothe, Komhreng, Kabui, Anāl, and, before their conversion to Christianity, Tangkhul people in Manipur, India.

Koubru, the first place for human habitation
After  Godfather Eepung Loinapa Apakpa created humans under his guidance and makes people's settlement to the place where God's living place in Earth where there was many fruits, eatable can be found for living.

See also
 Sanamahism
Lists of Creatures in Meitei Folklore
 Lists of deities in Sanamahism
 Lai Haraoba
 Meitei mythology
 Genesis creation narrative

References

External links 

 Wangkhemcha Chingtamlen, President of Kangleipak Historical and research centre.
 Revisiting the Creation Myth By James Oinam
 Review Kangleipak The Cradle Of Man
 A Sentimental Journey Into The Chaotic Streets Of Meitei Puyas - DR IM SINGH
 Discovery of Kangleipak
 Short Essays on Women and Society: Manipuri Women through the Century - Nunglekpam Premi Devi - Google Books

Sanamahism
Meitei culture
Creation myths